Elena Maria Catargiu-Obrenović (Serbian Cyrillic: Елена Марија Катарџи-Обреновић; 1831 – 16 July 1876 or 28 June 1879), known in Serbia as Marija Obrenović, was by birth a Moldavian and United Principalities boyaress.

Early life 
She was the daughter of Boyar Constantin Catargiu (1800–1871), a great landowner and Moldavian separatist and Romanian noblewoman Smaranda Balș (1811–1886), whose family dubiously claimed descent from the medieval House of Balšić.

Biography 
Elena Maria married Miloš Obrenović (1829–1861), the son of Jevrem Obrenović and their son Milan was born in 1854. 

In 1855, shortly after the birth of Milan, Maria and Miloš were divorced. In the early 1860s, she became the mistress of Domnitor Alexandru Ioan Cuza of Moldavia and Wallachia (1820–1873), and two sons Alexandru Al. Ioan Cuza and Dimitrie Cuza, were born out of their romance.
 
After Prince Michael III of Serbia was assassinated in 1868 without issue, Maria's son Milan ascended the throne as the new Prince of Serbia.
Her younger son Dimitrie committed suicide in 1888 and Alexandru died the following year.

Issue
 King Milan I of Serbia (1854–1901)
 Alexandru Al. Ioan Cuza (born between 1862 and 1864, died 1889)
 Dimitrie Cuza (1865–1888)

References

1831 births
Romanian nobility
Mistresses of Romanian royalty
Marija
1879 deaths
Burials at Eternitatea cemetery
Serbian people of Romanian descent
19th-century Romanian people
19th-century Romanian women